Murat Yıldırım (born 18 May 1987) is a professional footballer who plays as a midfielder for Çorum FK. Yıldırım picked up caps as a youth international, having been capped twice by the Turkey national under-19 team, and most recently by the Netherlands U21.

Honours
Individual
 AFC Ajax Talent of the Future: 2004

References

External links

 
 
 

1987 births
Living people
People from Çorum
Association football midfielders
Dutch people of Turkish descent
Dutch footballers
Netherlands youth international footballers
Turkish footballers
Turkey youth international footballers
Turkish emigrants to the Netherlands
AFC Ajax players
Samsunspor footballers
Bursaspor footballers
Kayseri Erciyesspor footballers
Gaziantep F.K. footballers
Boluspor footballers
Yeni Malatyaspor footballers
Gençlerbirliği S.K. footballers
Süper Lig players
TFF Second League players